Ernst Ruben Lagus (12 October 1896 – 15 July 1959), better known as Ruben Lagus, was a Finnish major general, a member of the Jäger Movement and the recipient of the first Mannerheim Cross. He participated in the Eastern Front of World War I as a volunteer of the 27th Royal Prussian Jäger Battalion, in the Finnish Civil War as battalion commander and as a supply officer in the Winter War. During the Continuation War, he commanded an armoured brigade, later division, which had a significant role in the influential Battle of Tali-Ihantala.

Early life

Ernst Ruben Lagus was born on 12 October 1896 in Koski Hl, Grand Duchy of Finland to parents Aleksander Gabriel Lagus and Emma Matilda Bellman. He became involved in the Jäger Movement, where Finnish volunteers received military training in Germany, and followed his brother to Germany in 1915. While in Germany, the Finnish volunteers formed the 27th Royal Prussian Jäger Battalion, fighting for the Imperial German Army on the Eastern Front of World War I. During this time, Lagus saw combat in several battles in the regions of Misa, Gulf of Riga and Lielupe. 

Lagus returned to Finland on 25 February 1918, joining the Finnish Civil War on the side of the Whites. As a commander of a battalion and an adjutant of a regiment, he took part in the Battles of Tampere, Kuokkala and Ollila.

Career in the Finnish Army

Following the end of the civil war, from 1918 to 1927 Lagus served as a company commander in various units. He was promoted captain in 1919 and major in 1924. In 1927 and 1928, he commanded the 3rd Bicycle Battalion, followed by postings as the commander of a Non-commissioned Officer School from 1928 to 1929 and as the commander of a company of officer cadets in the Finnish Cadet School from 1929 to 1933.

In 1933, Lagus was made the commander of a supply battalion, later regiment, holding the posting until the start of the Finno-Soviet Winter War in late 1939. During the war, which ended in early 1940, he served as the supply chief for the Army of the Isthmus. Promoted to colonel in 1940, Lagus was given command of the Bicycle Brigade and then the Jäger Brigade during the Interim Peace.

In the Continuation War, where Finland attacked the Soviet Union alongside Germany, Lagus initially led the 1st Jäger Brigade in the Finnish invasion of Ladoga Karelia. The unit was the first armored formation of meaningful size in the history of the Finnish Army. His forces were the first Finnish units to cross the pre-Winter War Finno-Soviet border, advancing eventually to Svir and Petrozavodsk as part of the Finnish invasion of East Karelia. During this initial offensive phase, Lagus was briefly given command of the 5th Division, but had to relinguish the posting to Ilmari Karhu who was preferred by the Finnish commander-in-chief Marshal Carl Gustav Emil Mannerheim. He was promoted to major general in 1941 and, on 22 July 1941, received the first Mannerheim Cross ever granted.

From 1942 to the end of the Continuation War in 1944, Lagus commanded the Finnish Armoured Division, to which the 1st Jäger Brigade was attached. Following the start of the Soviet Vyborg–Petrozavodsk offensive in 1944, his division took part in the highly influential Battle of Tali-Ihantala which repulsed the Soviet strategic offensive, paving the way for a Finnish exit from the war.

Following the Moscow Armistice which ended the war between Finland and Soviet Union, Lagus led a formation known as Group Lagus during the Lapland War in which the Finns expelled the remaining German forces from Finnish Lapland. From 1945 onwards, Lagus served as the commander of the 2nd Division, before resigning from service in 1947.

Later years and legacy

Following his retirement, Lagus became the chief executive officer of Lohjan Sato Oy, a Finnish limited company which built social housing in the Lohja region. He also took up gardening as a hobby. Lagus died on 15 July 1959 in Lohja. 

Lagus was married twice. His first marriage, with Olga Johanna (Jane) Ramsay ran from 1921 to 1927, after which he married Kenny Christine Emilia Gadd in 1935. He had a total of six children across the two marriages.

During his life, Lagus was given several military awards. The most notable of these is the Finnish Mannerheim Cross he received in 1941. His other notable awards include the Finnish Order of the Cross of Liberty and Order of the White Rose, the German Iron Cross (both 1st and 2nd class), and the Swedish Order of the Sword.

Notes

References 

 
 
 
 
 

1896 births
1959 deaths
People from Hämeenkoski
People from Häme Province (Grand Duchy of Finland)
German Army personnel of World War I
People of the Finnish Civil War (White side)
Finnish military personnel of World War II
Knights of the Mannerheim Cross
Winter War
Continuation War
Jägers of the Jäger Movement
Finnish major generals